Petralona is a small locality in Chalkidiki, Macedonia, Greece. It is 6 km N-W of Triglia and 35 km S-E of Thessaloniki. Its altitude is 270 m.

It is famous for the eponymous cave at about 1 km from the village, the Petralona cave in which was discovered one of the earliest European humanoids.

Prehistory 
The Petralona cave, at the foot of Mount Katsika, was discovered in 1959 by a local looking for a spring. In it was found in 1960 the  Petralona skull, extremely well preserved, dated to more than  years. It was named Archanthropus europaeus petraloniensis (Poulianos, 1976). This is considered as one of the oldest European Homo erectus specimen found so far.

References

External links 

* An important neolithic site: The Petralona Cave and Anthropological Museum.

Populated places in Chalkidiki